(stylized as redEyes) is a Japanese manga series written and illustrated by Jun Shindo and published by Kodansha. The manga is licensed for a French-language release in France, a German-language release in Germany and an Italian-language release by Panini Comics.

Summary

At the start of the series, the Republic of Regium is engaged in a costly war with the Federation of Dragnov. Dragnov wanted to reunify the two countries, but Regium was bitterly opposed to this and mobilized their army instead. In part due to winter conditions, the Regium forces had the upper hand at the start of the war. Gradually the Dragnov forces came close to overrunning Regium's last line of defence around the capital of Solgrenne, until Dragnov launched a new missile that caused serious damage to the capital despite being detonated indirectly 8 km outside the city. This convinced the Regium politicians to negotiate for a surrender, although the Regium Third Army refused to surrender and continued fighting.

The story follows Captain Grahad Mills, commander of the Regium special forces "Jackal" unit that utilizes the most advanced SAA (Special Assault Armor) in existence. With the last line of defense faltering, the Jackals are deployed in a last-ditch attempt to hold the line, and succeed at destroying all opponents in their sector. Unexpectedly though, Mills's subordinates all frame him for the murder of several Regium soldiers, causing him to be sentenced to execution. Mills then escapes from prison and tracks down the old members of the Jackals, trying to find out why they betrayed him.

The story's conflict takes place approximately in Eastern European countries such as Ukraine, Romania, Hungary, Croatia, Bosnia, Serbia, and Bulgaria, whose names and territories, however, have drastically changed. It is eventually revealed that the story takes place approximately several centuries in the future after a devastating World War, and the reason many nations use former American and NATO weaponry is because the United States had previously subjugated the world under a one world order controlled by itself.

In fact, in the comic universe, the United States succeeded in the Strategic Defence Initiative program (SDI), therefore making the US invulnerable to intercontinental ballistic missile (ICBM) attacks. As a result, the Cold War came to an end when the Soviet Union fell in the mid-eighties. However, the US continued their military programs, eventually succeeding in the construction of the first laser strategic weapon, reducing a city to cinders in seconds. With this huge power the United States created the DUPE (the Democratic Union for Peace on Earth) in 2001, a super-state with a territory encompassing the entire continent of Asia (except most of the Middle East and Turkey), Oceania and America (except Canada). As a consequence of the DUPE formation, the European Union is transformed into a continental state from the previous European NATO countries, but the EU remains a second-rate power compared to the DUPE.

The year 2001 became the new first year of the new era, known as 1 GU (the first year of the Great Unification's calendar), however in 50 GU (2050 AD) an unknown power is able to hack into the SDI system, which forces the system into safe mode and makes it unable to process orders from the DUPE command centre (except its original mission to intercept any launched ICBMs and missiles).  As a result of losing its deterrence system, the other countries of the planet launch a full-scale attack against the DUPE forces, beginning the 20-year war (World War III). The war ends de facto in 70 GU (2070 AD) with no winner and the death of half the population of the planet, while all main actors of the war are eventually dissolved and cease to exist following the mutual destruction.

Nations and alliances are created, formed and destroyed in the course of the war. One of the resulting nations is the Regium Kingdom, a new state incorporating the former nations of Ukraine, Poland, Slovakia, Romania and Bulgaria. In 87 GU (2087 AD), a nationalist revolt results in the fall of the monarchy and the creation of the Regium Republic (former Romania and Bulgaria). The remaining three states remain independent until 129 GU (2129 AD), when the countries decide to form the Dragnov Federation. In 179 GU (2179 AD) the Dragnov Federation and the Regium Republic go to war with each other, which lasts until 182 GU (2182 AD). The war results in the loss of two million soldiers for the Federation and 2.2 million soldiers and eight million civilians for the Republic. The Federation is able to launch a new type of missile against the Republic which is undetectable from the SDI satellites that are still carrying on their original mission after 110 years.

Characters

Jackals

Although there are eight Jackals in total, including Mills, oddly no mention of the missing eighth member is made when Mills asks both Waldmann and Lenny for information on the other members of the Jackals.

Captain Grahalt Mills

Nicknamed "Genocide" for destroying superior amounts of Dragnov troops alone, he prefers to work alone on the battlefield. He is a master of all forms of combat, managing to escape from a high security prison while killing the special forces soldiers who were guarding him. In the beginning he swears vengeance on those who have betrayed him but later decides to join the Third Army, feeling his original mission not complete and that he has a better chance to expose Krayz's plan.

Lieutenant Julian Krayz

Mills's second-in-command, he organizes a mutiny because the Dragnov forces are winning and he wants to be on the winning side. When assigned to eliminate enemy forces, he also kills friendly Regium soldiers and uses their deaths to frame Mills as a traitor who attempted to defect to Dragnov. After the war, he becomes Colonel in the Dragnov armed forces as well as remaining lieutenant in the Regium forces, effectively drawing pay from two armies. He later reveals that he is a descendant of the Regium Kingdom royal dynasty and wants to use the war to recreate the Regium Kingdom. For this purpose he also tries to gain access to the DUPE satellite network, thinking he has found a viable key to the system.

Captain Waldmann

Waldmann becomes captain of the GIGN's (Regium's SWAT) 1st armored unit after the war. A proud but ambitious soldier, he attempts to kill Mills before the war ends by asking a homeless boy to give Mills a booby-trapped package; Mills survives and becomes captain of the Jackals instead, a position that would have gone to Waldmann if Mills had died. Waldmann betrays Mills because he feels that Regium has lost the war, and because he failed to kill Mills previously. He is eventually killed by Mills after apologizing.

Lieutenant Lenny Kruger

Kruger is wounded by a sniper; Mills takes two rounds for him, saving his life. He betrays Mills because Krayz was using his sister, Leila, as a hostage, who becomes his subordinate after the war. He later fights against Mills, but is clear he has no intention to kill him. Once defeated by Mills, he begs Mills to kill him, feeling unworthy; however, Mills forgives him for his betrayal and "orders" him to join Mills' group. He later returns to be Mills' trusted aide and second-in-command and a valuable soldier in the Third Army.

Lars Odd

A famous sniper during the war, he uses a sniper variant of the Swashbuckler. He sends his sick brother to a military hospital for treatment, and it is implied that Krayz uses him as a hostage to get Lars to betray Mills. His brother dies anyway, and Lars quits the army to live in the mountains, swearing never to kill again. He later decides to temporarily withdraw his promise to help Mills reach the Regium Third Army, but dies in a sniping operation against a Dragnovian turret that prevents Mills from crossing the mountains. He manages to fire a round down the barrel of the turret but takes a direct hit from the gun in the process.

Klaus Gadon

Gadon betrays Mills because he wants the war to end, but later joins the Third Army and is charge of supply and logistics. He is responsible for feeding Krayz information about Mills' activities.

Rod Sterioni

Sterioni joins the Third Army after the war, but has not been seen since trying to get Lars to join him in the Third Army. It is later revealed that he actually left the Army to join Krayz's plan and that he originally wants to use Lars to kill the commander-in-chief of the Dragnov forces in Regium. He is later able to complete the mission himself, sneaking in the Dragnov occupation forces headquarters and executing the commander-in-chief, masked as a cleaner.

Others

Saya Hamilton

Hamilton is a homeless teenager who stays in the derelict building Mills uses as bait to lure Waldmann. She insists on staying with Mills afterward. Her hometown is in the process of being evacuated at the end of the war when trigger-happy Dragnovian troops blow up a refugee truck carrying her family and friends.

Colonel Classad

A hero of Regium, he is the commander of the Ranger Regiment, an inter-service special forces unit. He recruits Mills while he is working as a pump attendant at a gas station, when ordinarily only elite members of the military would have been selected. Near the end of training, Colonel Classad leads a rebellion with several platoons of active-duty Rangers to seize the SAA at the training camp. The rebels' intention is to start a war with Dragnov as they are dismayed by the government's lack of honor and willingness to give in to Dragnov in regards to territorial demands. Classad however deliberately forces a confrontation with Mills and forces Mills to shoot him after a lengthy battle, transforming him into the killing machine "Genocide". Mills then wipes out the other rebels single-handedly.

Lieutenant Leila Kruger

She is the sister of Lenny Kruger, and adjutant of Krayz, whom she has an intimate relationship with.

Colonel Leon Ridas

Ridas is the strategist of the Third Army, with uncharacteristically unkempt hair. He is largely responsible for the Third Army's success so far, and partly responsible for the "Miracle of Lent", wherein Ridas directs the eight members of the Jackals, commanded by Mills, and holds off an entire Dragnovian armored division for two days.

References

Red Eyes Chp. 20 Page 17, Map of the story's conflict

External links

Shōnen manga
2000 manga